Thoracocarpus is a genus of plants first described as a genus in 1958. It contains only one known species, Thoracocarpus bissectus a hemiepiphytic vine. It is native to Costa Rica, Panama, Cuba, Trinidad and Tobago, and South America (Colombia, Venezuela, the Guianas, Brazil, Bolivia, Peru, Ecuador).

References

Cyclanthaceae
Monotypic Pandanales genera
Flora of Central America
Flora of South America
Flora of the Caribbean